Pablo "Champion" Mesa (1898 - February, 1928) was a Cuban baseball outfielder in the Negro leagues. He played from 1921 to 1927 with the Cuban Stars (East).

References

External links
 and Baseball-Reference Black Baseball stats and Seamheads

1898 births
1928 deaths
Cuban Stars (East) players
20th-century African-American sportspeople
People from Caibarién